Paul Piché (born September 5, 1953 in La Minerve, Quebec) is a singer-songwriter, environmentalist, political activist and Quebec sovereigntist.

He mostly composes on acoustic guitar, although some of his recent work has had some electronica sound input. Many of his songs have become classics of the Québécois repertoire at cabaret nights, parties, camp fires, and especially at Saint-Jean-Baptiste Day celebrations.

Piché studied archaeology at the Université de Montréal, and in the early 1970s sang in Quebec colleges. In 1977 the keyboardist Robert Léger of Beau Dommage encouraged him to record his first LP, À qui appartient le beau temps, which sold more than 100,000 copies.

In 1980, Piché releases his second album, L’escalier, which was inspired by his trip down the staircase in René Lévesque Boulevard.

From then on, Piché began working with the keyboardist Michel Hinton (also from Beau Dommage). His single "Tous les vents", reached second place on the Radio-activité chart in August 1984 and his album Nouvelles d'Europe won the Félix Award for best rock album of 1985. In 1986 he performed with Michel Rivard and released a double album, Intégral, which is a collection of all his works. He then travelled throughout Quebec and performed at the festivals of Millénaire in Brussels, in La Rochelle, and in Nyon, Switzerland.

Sur le chemin des incendies, which sold more than 100,000 copies, revealed a more personal facet of the songwriter. Many pieces were written in collaboration with the guitarist Rick Haworth. "J'appelle", reached first place on the Radio activité chart in December 1988.

Piché participated in the St-Jean Baptiste nationalist gatherings in 1990 on the Plains of Abraham of Quebec City, and on St. Helen's Island in Montreal. Often associated with the great names of the Quebec chanson, Piché participated in La Fête à Vigneault at the Francofolies of Montreal in 1990, which celebrated the 30-year-career of the national poet. Montreal's La Presse proclaimed Piché 'Personality of the Year' in the song category.

An artist committed to the causes of workers, of the state, and of ecology, Piché is the songster of the common man. Such songs as "À qui appartient le beau temps", and "Les Pleins" have become classics of the genre.

Journalist Laurent Saulnier stated that Piché was the missing link between Bruce Springsteen and Jacques Brel, "an original mixture of French song, American rock, and Quebec folklore". (Voir, February 23, 1989).

In 2016, during the Saint-Jean-Baptiste Day, he performed after Triple Rock, a group that is made out of Théo, Yoopa and Benoît Archambault. From June 17 to 19, 2018, Paul had performed at the City Center in Saint-Constant, Quebec after Alexis Arbour.

Discography

Studio albums
1977 – À qui appartient l'beau temps?
1980 – L'escalier
1982 – Paul Piché (Les Pleins)
1984 – Nouvelles d'Europe
1988 – Sur le chemin des incendies
1993 – L'instant
1999 – Le voyage
2009 – Sur ce côté de la Terre

Compilations
1986 – Intégral
1996 – L'un et l'autre

See also
List of Quebec musicians
Music of Quebec
Culture of Quebec
Politics of Quebec

References

External links
Audiogram – record label – streaming of albums available
Audio excerpts on Archambault.ca
Fan site
Translations of the lyrics of Paul Piché

1953 births
Canadian male singers
Canadian rock singers
Canadian singer-songwriters
French-language singers of Canada
French Quebecers
Living people
Songwriters from Quebec
Audiogram (label) artists
Quebec sovereigntists
Université de Montréal alumni
Canadian male singer-songwriters